"Good Fun" is a song by German DJ and record production team Bass Bumpers, released in 1994 as a single only. It was a notable hit in Europe, especially in Spain and Finland, where it peaked at number three and nineteen. The song was also a top 40 hit in Switzerland, and on the European Hot 100, it reached number 82 in November 1994.

Critical reception
Pan-European magazine Music & Media wrote, "Minimalistic techno is the fare here and once again this outfit proves that sticking to the basics is quite often the best. The song itself has a conventional structure, which gives it some pop crossover appeal as well."

Track listing
 12", Europe (1994)
"Good Fun" (12" Power Mix) — 7:11
"Good Fun" (Hard Attack Mix) — 7:02

 12" (Remixes), Spain (1995)
"Good Fun" (Damage Control Mix) — 5:10
"Good Fun" (Peter Parker Mix) — 5:46
"Good Fun" (The World's Address Mix) — 8:50

 CD single, France (1994)
"Good Fun" (7" Radio Mix) — 3:25
"Good Fun" (12" Power Mix) — 7:11

 CD maxi, Germany (1994)
"Good Fun" (7" Radio Mix) — 3:25
"Good Fun" (12" Power Mix) — 7:11
"Good Fun" (Hard Attack Mix) — 7:02
"Good Fun" (Acapella) — 5:25

Charts

References

1994 singles
1994 songs
Techno songs
English-language German songs
Bass Bumpers songs